Klis is a Croatian municipality located around a mountain fortress bearing the same name. It is located in the region of Dalmatia, located just northeast of Solin and Split near the eponymous mountain pass. It has a population of 3,001, totalling 4,801 together with the eight other villages in its municipality (2011 census).

The Klis mountain pass separates the mountains Mosor and Kozjak at an altitude of 360m. It has had a major strategic value throughout history because any inland force passing through Klis would have been able to easily reach the entire region of Split and Kaštela. During the Ottoman wars in Europe an already existing Roman fortress on a nearby hill was expanded into Klis Fortress. It was the centre of a sanjak within the Province of Bosnia during Ottoman rule. Klis was also ruled by the Kingdom of Bosnia, the Venetian Republic, and Austria-Hungary.
Due to its geographical position Klis is also susceptible to a rather strong bura wind.

History 
Read about history of Klis here: Historical Unit Kliški uskoci - History of Klis

In Klis area was first mentioned name of "Uskoks"

Notable objects 

 One of only three preserved Ottoman mosques on the territory of Croatia exists in the Klis fortress. The mosque was built shortly after the Ottoman conquest of Klis in year 1537. It was converted into a Catholic church after the Venetian conquest of Klis in year 1648, and it has been used for that purpose ever since.
 An old Turkish public water faucet exists in the town.

Transportation 
The village is served by local bus from Split city centre.

See also
Klis Fortress
Petar Kružić
 Historical Unit Kliški uskoci

References

External links
 Klis homepage
 Historical Unit Kliški uskoci

Former capitals of Croatia
Municipalities of Croatia
Populated places in Split-Dalmatia County